Candela Collection is a 1996 compilation album by Swedish dansband Candela.

Track listing
Att det i stjärnorna står skrivet (Warnerbring/Möller)
Malmö - Köpenhamn (Stråhed - Svenling)
Varje litet ögonkast (Every Little Thing) (Carter - Andersson - Rosin - Månsson)
Du finns i mina tankar (Ebbesson)
Säg har du glömt (Jensen)
Galen (Nelson/Lindfors)
Av hela mitt hjärta (Månsson - Lösnitz)
Nya vingar (Palm - Georgsson)
Där vallmoblomman står (Stråhed)
Place de Trocadero (Stråhed)
När du ser på mig (B. Heil)
Lycklig igen (Stråhed)
Som om du var här (Eriksson)
Nätterna med dig (Thunqvist - Svenling)
Bang Bang (Norell/Oson/Bard)
Jag önskar mig (Lindholm)
I mina drömmar (Eriksson)
Viva! Fernando Garcia (Månsson -Svenling)
Älskar du mig (Möller)
We Are Family (Rogers - Edwards)

References 

1996 compilation albums
Candela (Swedish band) albums
Compilation albums by Swedish artists